Martín Caparrós (born May 29, 1957 in Buenos Aires, Argentina) is a writer,and social commentator. His father was Antonio Caparrós, a renowned psychiatrist. Caparrós began professional writing at age sixteen. His first professional job in journalism was with the now-defunct daily Noticias. He also wrote extensively for international publications, including The New York Times, The Guardian, El País, and The Washington Post.

As a writer, Martin Caparrós is known for his detailed and insightful works of fiction and non-fiction. Some of his most notable books include La Voluntad, El Hambre, and "El Interior." His books have been translated into numerous languages, earning him widespread acclaim.

Caparrós has also been active in various social and political causes. He has campaigned for greater democratic participation in Latin America and to raise awareness about poverty, inequality, and human rights issues. He has received numerous awards for his work, including the Planeta Prize for "La Historia" in 2011. Following the 1976 Argentine coup d'état, Caparrós exiled to France. He obtained a history degree in Paris at the University of Paris. He currently resides in Madrid.

Fiction 

 1984 – Ansay o los infortunios de la gloria
 1986 – No velas a tus muertos
 1990 – El tercer cuerpo
 1990 – La noche anterior
 1999 – La Historia
 2001 – Un día en la vida de Dios
 2004 – Valfierno
 2008 – A quien corresponda
 2011 – Los Living
 2013 – Comí
 2016 – Echeverría
 2018 – Todo por la patria'
 2020 – Sinfin 2022 – Dziadkowie (Grandparents) Non-fiction 
 1992 – Larga distancia 1994 – Dios Mío 1995 – La Patria Capicúa 1997 – La Voluntad 1999 – La guerra moderna 2001 – Extinción, últimas imágenes del trabajo en la Argentina. 2002 – Bingo! 2003 – Amor y anarquía 2002 – Qué País, Informe urgente sobre la Argentina que viene. 2005 – Boquita, Editorial Planeta, 354 pages. 
 2006 – El Interior.
 2009 – Una luna.
 2012 – Argentinismos.
 2014 – Hunger: The Oldest Problem, Melville House Publishing
 2016 – Lacronica 2018 – Postales 2019 – Ahorita 2021 – Ñamerica''

Awards and distinctions
1992: Premio Internacional de Periodismo Rey de España
2004: Premio Planeta Latinoamérica 
2011: Premio Herralde de Novela 
2014: Premio Konex de Platino
2016: Premio Cálamo Extraordinario
2016: Premio Letterario Internazionale Tiziano Terzani
2016: Premio Internacional de Ensayo Caballero Bonald
2017: Premio Nacional de Periodismo Miguel Delibes
2017: Premio María Moors Cabot, Columbia University
2017: Ciudadano Ilustre de la Ciudad Autónoma de Buenos Aires
2019: Premio Ítaca en reconocimiento a su trayectoria periodística, Universidad de Barcelona
2022: Premio Especial del Jurado de los Premios Archiletras de la Lengua
2022: Premios Ortega y Gasset

Filmography 
 Crónicas Mexicas, Contrakultura Films, Eduardo Montes-Bradley, director. Argentina, 2003. (Documentary)
 Cazadores de Utopías, David Blaustein, director. Argentina (Documentary)

References

1957 births
Living people
University of Paris alumni
Argentine male novelists
Argentine essayists
Male essayists
20th-century Argentine novelists
21st-century Argentine novelists
21st-century Argentine male writers
Argentine expatriates in France